This is a list of museums in Abruzzo, Italy.

Archaeological museum

Art museum

Diocesan museum

Museum

References

External links

Abruzzo